Sophie Charlotte may refer to:

 Sophie Charlotte of Hesse-Kassel (1678–1749), princess of Hesse-Kassel
 Charlotte Christine of Brunswick-Lüneburg (1694–1715), German duchess
 Princess Charlotte Sophie of Saxe-Coburg-Saalfeld (1731–1810), German duchess
 Duchess Sophie Charlotte in Bavaria (1847–1897), Duchess of Alençon and born Duchess in Bavaria
 Sophie Charlotte (actress) (born 1989), Brazilian actress

See also
 Sophia Charlotte (disambiguation)